S-methyl-5'-thioinosine phosphorylase (MTIP, MTI phosphorylase, methylthioinosine phosphorylase) is an enzyme with systematic name S-methyl-5'-thioinosine:phosphate S-methyl-5-thio-alpha-D-ribosyl-transferase. This enzyme catalyses the following chemical reaction

 S-methyl-5'-thioinosine + phosphate  hypoxanthine + S-methyl-5-thio-alpha-D-ribose 1-phosphate

The catabolism of 5'-methylthioadenosine in Pseudomonas aeruginosa involves deamination to S-methyl-5'-thioinosine (EC 3.5.4.31, S-methyl-5'-thioadenosine deaminase) and phosphorolysis to hypoxanthine.

References

External links 
 

EC 2.4.2